A wire signal is a brevity code used by telegraphers to save time and cost when sending long messages. The best-known code was the 92 Code adopted by Western Union in 1859. The code was designed to reduce bandwidth consumption over telegraph lines, thus speeding transmissions by utilizing a numerical code system for frequently used phrases.

92 Code 
Several of the codes are taken from The Telegraph Instructor by G.M. Dodge. Dodge notes:
Other numerical signals are used by different railroads for different purposes, for instance, the signal “47” upon some railroads means “display signals”; while the signal “48” means “signals are displayed”. The numerals “9” and “12” are frequently used for “correct”. Other numerals are used for the different officials’ messages, agents’ messages, etc.
Codes that are not listed in the 1901 edition of Dodge are marked with an asterisk (*).

In the above list, the numbers 19 and 31 refer to train order operations whereby messages from the dispatcher about changes in railroad routing and scheduling were written on paper forms. Form 19 was designed to be passed to the train as it went through a station at speed. Form 31 required hand delivery for confirmation.

Contemporary usage 
Today, amateur radio operators still use codes 73 and 88 regularly, and -30- is used in journalism, as it was shorthand for "No more - the end". The Young Ladies Radio League uses code 33 to mean "love sealed with friendship and mutual respect between one YL [young lady] and another YL" or simply "hugs." A once-used but unofficial code 99 meant "go to hell." The other codes have mostly fallen into disuse.

1873 Telegraph Rules from the Lakeshore and Tuscarawas Valley Railway Company 
The following code was taken from 1873 telegraph rulebook of the Lakeshore and Tuscarawas Valley Railway Company of Cleveland, Ohio.

See also 
 Morse code abbreviations
 Phillips Code

External links 
 Stuttgart Telegraph Convention 1857 between states of the Austro-Germanic Union. official title "Revised Convention of the Austro-German Telegraph Union, Stuttgart, 3 October 1857, 118 CTS5"? ("Service Instructions" section)
 Radiotelegraph and Radiotelephone Codes, Prowords And Abbreviations
 International Communications: The International Telecommunication Union and Universal Postal Union (page 19)
 Western Union and the Creation of the American Corporate Order, 1845-1893 By Joshua D. Wolff
 The Western Union Telegraph Company, rules, regulations, and instructions
 Wood's Plan of Telegraphic Instruction
 On the Origin of 73
 88, Or How Telegraphers Coded 'Love and Kisses'
 The Phillips Code
 ORIGIN OF HAM SPEAK - FACT, LEGENDS AND MYTHS???
 Ham Speak - Know the Lingo
 SignalHarbor: 73 speak
 The Telecommunications Illustrated Dictionary, Second Edition
 telegraphic and signal codes: annotated directory of scans, transcriptions : notes
 Nonsecret Code: An Overview of Early Telegraph Codes
 Cipher and telegraph codes

References 

Encodings
Telegrams
Western Union
Brevity codes